Armazi may mean:
Armazi, an ancient city in Georgia
Armazi stele (disambiguation), steles found in Armazi
Armazi, a pagan deity of ancient Georgians
Armazi, a 9th-century church in Georgia
Armaz(i), a male name in Georgia